The 2011–12 Princeton Tigers men's basketball team represented Princeton University during the 2011–12 NCAA Division I men's basketball season. The Tigers, led by first year head coach Mitch Henderson, played their home games at Jadwin Gymnasium and are members of the Ivy League. The team captains were seniors Douglas Davis and Patrick Saunders. They finished the season 20–12, 10–4 in Ivy League play to finish in third place. They were invited to the 2012 College Basketball Invitational where they defeated Evansville in the first round before falling in the quarterfinals to Pittsburgh. The season was highlighted by wins over a ranked Harvard team and the Florida State Seminoles.  The team was led by unanimous first team All-Ivy League selection Ian Hummer and second team selection Douglas Davis.

Preview
Princeton entered the season having won the 2010–11 Ivy League men's basketball season championship and having earned the resulting 2011 NCAA Division I men's basketball tournament invitation.  The team entered the season having lost senior captains Dan Mavraides and Kareem Maddox. Maddox was the reigning Ivy League Defensive Player of the Year and a unanimous first team All-Ivy selection.  Mavraides had been a second team All-Ivy selection. The team returned second team All-Ivy selection Hummer.

Entering the 2011–12 NCAA Division I men's basketball season head coach Mitch Henderson began his tenure at Princeton, taking over for Sydney Johnson. With the move that resulted from Johnson taking a new coaching job, Princeton has six alumni who are active Division I head coaches, a total second only to eight by the North Carolina Tar Heels men's basketball program. The Ivy League media poll selected Princeton to be tied with Yale for second place behind Harvard. Princeton had been the preseason favorite the year before.

Roster

Schedule
With a new first-time head coach, the team got off to slow starts. It started the season with a 1–5 record, but won 18 of its final 24 games and started its conference schedule with a 2–3 record, but won 8 of its final 9 games. The recovery enabled the team to qualify for its 32nd post season appearance (24 NCAA, 5 NIT and 2 CBI).

Princeton earned its first home win against a ranked opponent since the 1976–77 team's January 3, 1977, victory over Notre Dame by defeating Harvard (No. 21 Coaches/25 AP) on February 11, 2012. The win was also its first against a ranked opponent on any court since November 11, 1997, which is when the 1997–98 team opened its season with a victory over a ranked Texas team at Meadowlands Arena (now named Izod Center) in East Rutherford, New Jersey. Princeton also defeated eventual 2012 ACC men's basketball tournament champion Florida State five weeks after Harvard did as well as Big East Conference member and New Jersey rival . In addition, the team's schedule included the ACC's NC State. Its results against Harvard, Florida State and NC State give the team a 2–2 record against teams in the 2012 NCAA Division I men's basketball tournament.

For the 18th consecutive season, the Ivy League men's basketball schedule concluded with a Tuesday Penn–Princeton basketball rivalry game against the 2011–12 Quakers. Princeton's 62–52 victory enabled it to retain slim 26–25 and 24–23 leads in terms of Ivy League Championships and Ivy League team NCAA Tournament appearances, respectively.

In the first round of the 2012 CBI Tournament, senior Douglas Davis scored a career-high 31 points to lead Princeton to a 95–86 victory over Evansville. Although Davis posted another 20 points in the subsequent quarterfinal game against Pittsburgh to surpass Kit Mueller for second place on the Princeton scoring list, Princeton lost 82–61 to end the season. Davis' appearance in the March 19 contest also enabled him to surpass Ryan Wittman as the Ivy League's all-time leader in games played (122). Pittsburgh eventually went on to win the tournament.

|-
!colspan=9| Regular Season

|-
!colspan=9| 2012 CBI

All-Ivy
The following players earned Ivy League postseason recognition:
 
First Team All-Ivy
^Ian Hummer, Princeton (Jr., F, Vienna, Virginia)
 
Second Team All-Ivy
Douglas Davis, Princeton (Sr., G, Philadelphia)
^Unanimous Selection

Other
The National Association of Basketball Coaches announced their Division I All‐District District 13 team on March 14, recognizing the nation's best men's collegiate basketball student-athletes. Ian Hummer was a second team selection.

References

External links
Princeton Tigers @ ESPN.com
2011 stats @ ESPN.com

Princeton Tigers men's basketball seasons
Princeton
Princeton
Prince
Prince